Costigliole Saluzzo is a comune (municipality) in the Province of Cuneo in the Italian region Piedmont, located about  southwest of Turin and about  north of Cuneo.

Costigliole Saluzzo borders the following municipalities: Busca, Piasco, Rossana, Verzuolo, and Villafalletto.

Demographic evolution

Twin towns — sister cities
Costigliole Saluzzo is twinned with:

  Banon, Alpes-de-Haute-Provence, France 
  Beaumont-lès-Valence, France
  Oriolo, Italy

References

Cities and towns in Piedmont